The following lists Michigan State Historic Sites in St. Clair County, Michigan, United States. Sites marked with a dagger (†) are also listed on the National Register of Historic Places in St. Clair County, Michigan. Those with a double dagger (‡) are also designated National Historic Landmarks.


Current listings

See also
 National Register of Historic Places listings in St. Clair County, Michigan

Sources
 Historic Sites Online – "St. Clair" County. Michigan State Housing Developmental Authority. Accessed May 31, 2011.
 Historic Sites Online – "Saint Clair" County. Michigan State Housing Developmental Authority. Accessed May 31, 2011.

References

Saint Clair County
State Historic Sites